Jonas Raess (born 8 March 1994) is a Swiss long-distance runner. He competed in the 5000 metres at the 2020 Summer Olympics.

References

Swiss male long-distance runners
Athletes (track and field) at the 2020 Summer Olympics
1994 births
Living people
Olympic athletes of Switzerland
Universiade gold medalists for Switzerland
Medalists at the 2019 Summer Universiade
Universiade medalists in athletics (track and field)